Ángel Domingo López Ruano, known simply as Ángel (born 10 March 1981), is a Spanish former professional footballer. An attacking right-back, he could also operate as a right midfielder.

Club career
Ángel was born in Las Palmas, Canary Islands. After first appearing professionally with hometown's UD Las Palmas, playing 64 La Liga games from 2000 to 2002, he made a name for himself as a stamina-filled wingback at fellow league club RC Celta de Vigo, signing with the Galicians in the 2003 January transfer window. He appeared in 15 league matches in the second part of the season as the team qualified to the UEFA Champions League for the first time ever; however, also with the player as first-choice, they would be relegated at the end of the 2003–04 campaign.

On the last day of 2007–08's summer transfer deadline, Ángel joined Villarreal CF. In a season where the team dubbed the Yellow Submarine achieved a best-ever runner-up league position, he split right-back duties with veteran Javi Venta, a situation which again befell the following campaign (22 matches for Venta, 21 for López).

In 2009–10, Ángel again battled with Venta for first-choice status. On 4 April 2010 he scored his first goal for Villarreal, shooting from 30 yards to open the score at Real Valladolid in an eventual 2–0 win.

After Venta's departure to Levante UD, Ángel was the undisputed right-back. On 9 January 2011, during a 4–2 away loss against Real Madrid, he suffered a severe injury in his left knee – anterior cruciate ligament – being sidelined for the next six months.

International career
Ángel won his first cap for the Spain national team in a 0–1 friendly defeat with Romania in Cádiz, on 15 November 2006.

References

External links

1981 births
Living people
Spanish footballers
Footballers from Las Palmas
Association football defenders
Association football midfielders
La Liga players
Segunda División players
Tercera División players
UD Las Palmas Atlético players
UD Las Palmas players
RC Celta de Vigo players
Villarreal CF players
Real Betis players
Spain under-21 international footballers
Spain international footballers